The Defence Medal 1940–1945 is the award rewarded to those military and civilian personnel who participated in the fight against the German invasion and occupation of Norway between 1940 and 1945.

The Defence Medal 1940–1945 can be awarded both to Norwegian and foreign citizens. The medal may still be awarded due to the large number of participants in the defence of Norway during World War II and the difficulties tracking down all eligible recipients.

The medal is in bronze. On the obverse is the coat of arms with the inscription . On the reverse is the royal flag, the flag and national flag. Above these a narrow circle with the inscription  (Participant in the struggle). The image is surrounded by a chain. The band is in the Norwegian national colors. The band can be fitted with a rosette if the recipient has distinguished himself several times. The medal is made by the goldsmith firm of J. Tostrup in Oslo.

As of 2017, the Defence Medal 1940–1945 ranks as 23rd of the Norwegian decorations.

Qualification details
The medal was awarded to those meeting one of the following criteria:
 Taking part in the campaign in Norway in 1940 for five days or more.
 Service in the Norwegian armed forces and merchant fleet outside of Norway for four months or more (awarded for less than four months service if one served in units that moved to Norway as part of the liberation).
 Taking part in the campaign in Finnmark (winter 1944-45) for one month or more.
 Allied soldiers who took part in the liberation of Norway and served for one month or more.
 Service in the resistance forces for four months or more.

References

Military awards and decorations of Norway
Awards established in 1945
1945 establishments in Norway